Hank Jones' Quartet (full title Hank Jones Trio Plus the Flute of Bobby Jasper and also released as Relaxin' at Camarillo) is an album by American jazz pianist Hank Jones recorded in 1956 for the Savoy label.

Reception

Allmusic awarded the album 4 stars stating "Hank Jones has made many memorable albums over his long career, but this 1956 session with Belgian flutist Bobby Jaspar is one that might easily get overlooked. Jaspar's melodious flute adds some magic ...Jones delivers his usual superb performance, while Paul Chambers has several fine solos, and drummer Kenny Clarke propels the date with his crisp brushwork".

Track listing
 "Moonlight Becomes You" (Jimmy Van Heusen, Johnny Burke) – 7:08
 "Relaxin' at Camarillo" (Charlie Parker) – 12:19
 "Minor Conception" (Hank Jones) – 5:28
 "Sunday in Savannah" (Hugh Mackay) – 4:37
 "Spontaneous Combustion" (Cannonball Adderley) – 6:34

Personnel 
Hank Jones – piano
Bobby Jaspar – flute 
Paul Chambers – bass
Kenny Clarke – drums

References 

1956 albums
Hank Jones albums
Savoy Records albums
Albums produced by Ozzie Cadena
Albums recorded at Van Gelder Studio